Robert Lyndon Simmonds (born 11 November 1966) is a Welsh former footballer who played as a forward. He played for Leeds United, Swansea City and Rochdale before retiring through injury.

References

1966 births
Living people
Welsh footballers
Footballers from Pontypool
Association football forwards
Wales youth international footballers
Leeds United F.C. players
Swansea City A.F.C. players
Rochdale A.F.C. players
English Football League players